Savignia superstes is a species of sheet weaver found in France. It was described by Thaler in 1984.

References

Linyphiidae
Spiders described in 1984
Spiders of Europe